Rush'n Attack is a run and gun video game developed and released by Konami in North American arcades in 1985, and converted to the Nintendo Entertainment System and MS-DOS PCs. Its name is a play on the phrase "Russian attack" due to its Cold War setting.

Gameplay
The players assume the roles of the United States special operations Green Berets (named Steve and Ben on the Japanese Famicom ad poster) who are infiltrating an enemy military base to save POWs from execution by firing squad. There are four stages, each ending with a special group of ambushers:
Marshalling Area, ends with a truckload of jump-kicking enemies
Harbor, ends with a pack of German Shepherds
Air Base, ends  with three autogyros
Siberian Camp, ends with a flame thrower operator
The Soviet Armed Forces that attack throughout every stage are Soldiers, Gunners, Supply Runners, Combat Specialists, Jetpack Soldiers, German Shepherds, Parachute Gunners, Gyrocopters, and Flame Throwers.

The omnipresent combat knife can be supplemented with captured arms. By eliminating certain Russian militants, the players can obtain a three-shot flamethrower, a four-shot RPG, or a three-pack of hand grenades.  When the mission is accomplished, the four rescued POWs salute and the player repeats the game from the first stage on the next difficulty level. An invisible time limit kills the player.

Extra lives are given at 30,000 and 70,000, and per 70,000 up to 980,000, and survival of the fittest mode thereafter.

Ports

In 1986 Ocean Software released home versions as Green Beret on their Imagine label for the ZX Spectrum, Commodore Plus/4, Commodore 64, Amstrad CPC, Atari 8-bit family, MSX, and BBC Micro.

The Commodore 64 port was programmed by David Collier, with graphics by Steve Wahid and music by Martin Galway. The Spectrum version was programmed by Jonathan Smith.

It was released in North America in December 1986 and an unrelated IBM PC version was released by Konami for the North American market with the Rush'n Attack name in 1989.

Famicom Disk System and NES
A Family Computer Disk System version of Green Beret was released in Japan on April 10, 1987, along with a corresponding version for the Nintendo Entertainment System (as Rush'n Attack) released that month in North America, and on June 8, 1989 in Europe.

The objective in the NES version was changed from rescuing prisoners to destroying a secret weapon being developed in the enemy's headquarters. A two-player simultaneous cooperative mode was introduced. The gameplay mechanics are essentially identical to the arcade version; however, the Flamethrower is removed (only the Rocket Launcher and Grenades remain) and two new power-up items are introduced: a Star mark which grants invincibility and a pistol with unlimited ammo, both which are only usable for a limited period. The NES version features two additional stages that are not in the arcade game: an airport set between the Missile Base and the Harbor, where the player faces a group of rocket soldiers at the end; and a new final stage set inside the enemy's base that ends with the player using rocket launchers dropped by enemy soldiers to disarm a nuclear missile. The flamethrower corps at the end of the Warehouse stage was replaced by a paratrooper unit. The Famicom version has a few cosmetic differences with higher difficulty compared to its NES counterpart, along with underground areas in three of the levels. Accessed via destroying specific mines that reveal ladders to the floors below.

Game Boy Advance
A conversion of the arcade version of Rush'n Attack is included in the 2002 compilation Konami Collector's Series: Arcade Advanced for the Game Boy Advance. The game features the same four stages as in the arcade version, and two extra stages unlocked via the Konami Code. A two-player versus mode has been added, which utilizes the Game Link Cable. The A button jumps instead of the d-pad.

Nintendo DS
A second portable version is included in the 2007 compilation Konami Classics Series: Arcade Hits for the Nintendo DS. Unlike the GBA version, the DS version is a direct port of the original arcade game. However, it includes various bonus features such as scans of the instruction cards and leaflet, as well as tips.

Xbox 360
Rush'n Attack was released on Xbox Live Arcade for the Xbox 360 on May 23, 2007. This version is another direct port of the arcade game, but features an optional game mode with improved graphics and a remixed soundtrack. This version was developed by Digital Eclipse.

Konami Net DX
Green Beret was released for smartphones in Japan in 2006. The mobile version is a direct port of the Famicom version with a new health bar. The mobile port was re-released in China for Java phones on December 26, 2008.

Reception

In Japan, Game Machine listed Green Beret in its November 15, 1985 issue as the third most successful table arcade unit of the month. In Europe, Green Beret was considered one "of the first military shoot 'em ups" on the market and became a major hit in arcades. The home computer conversions topped the UK Gallup sales charts in June 1986, becoming one of the top four best-selling games of 1986 in the UK, and one of the year's top three best-selling Commodore 64 games. Its budget re-release later topped the UK budget sales chart in July 1989.

Green Beret was well-received by critics. Mike Roberts and Eric Doyle of Computer Gamer magazine gave the arcade game a positive review, comparing it favorably with the action film Rambo: First Blood Part II (1985) while calling it an "incredibly violent game" that is "brilliant to play". Commodore User said the arcade version is "a kind of rightwards scrolling Commando [but] much better" while praising "brilliant" graphics and sound.

Computer and Video Games reviewed the Commodore 64 and ZX Spectrum versions, calling the game "Konami's answer" to Capcom's Commando (1985) and comparing it favorably with the Rambo film series. The review said it is fast, "furious and terribly addictive".

The MS-DOS version of Rush'n Attack was reviewed in 1989 in Dragon magazine by Patricia Hartley and Kirk Lesser, giving 3 out of 5 stars. ACE reviewed the budget re-release of Green Beret for the Commodore 64, ZX Spectrum, and Amstrad CPC in 1989, calling it an "intelligently thought out shoot 'em up with excellent graphics". The NES version ranked 99 on IGN's top 100 NES games list.

See also
 Contra
 Missing in Action 
 Rush'n Attack: Ex-Patriot

Notes

References

External links

Green Beret at Konami Net DX (Japanese)
Green Beret at Konami Mobile (Chinese)

1985 video games
Amstrad CPC games
Arcade video games
Atari 8-bit family games
BBC Micro and Acorn Electron games
Cold War video games
Commodore 16 and Plus/4 games
Commodore 64 games
DOS games
Famicom Disk System games
Cancelled Game Boy Color games
Konami arcade games
Konami games
Nintendo Entertainment System games
Nintendo Switch games
Platform games
PlayChoice-10 games
PlayStation 4 games
Run and gun games
Video games scored by Iku Mizutani
Video games scored by Martin Galway
Xbox 360 Live Arcade games
ZX Spectrum games
Digital Eclipse games
Multiplayer and single-player video games
Video games developed in Japan
Video games set in the Soviet Union
Hamster Corporation games